Brissus is a genus of echinoderms belonging to the family Brissidae.

The genus has cosmopolitan distribution.

Species:

Brissus agassizii 
Brissus bridgeboronensis 
Brissus camagueyensis 
Brissus caobaense 
Brissus duperieri 
Brissus durhami 
Brissus eximius 
Brissus expansus 
Brissus fosteri 
Brissus gigas 
Brissus glenni 
Brissus greifatensis 
Brissus inaequalis 
Brissus kewi 
Brissus lasti 
Brissus latecarinatus 
Brissus latidunensis 
Brissus meridionalis 
Brissus miocaenicus 
Brissus obesus 
Brissus rana 
Brissus sagrae 
Brissus shaimaae 
Brissus unicolor

References

 
Brissidae
Echinoidea genera